Uwe Kellner (born 17 March 1966 in Jena) is a German rower, who competed for the SC Dynamo Berlin / Sportvereinigung (SV) Dynamo. He won the medals at the international rowing competitions.

References 

1966 births
Sportspeople from Jena
German male rowers
Living people
Olympic medalists in rowing
World Rowing Championships medalists for East Germany
Olympic silver medalists for Germany
Olympic rowers of Germany
Rowers at the 1992 Summer Olympics
Medalists at the 1992 Summer Olympics